Miguel Arraes de Alencar (15 December 1916 – 13 August 2005) was a Brazilian lawyer and politician. He was mayor of Recife, State Deputy, Federal Deputy and three times Governor of Pernambuco.

Birth

Arraes was born in Araripe in the state of Ceará, but moved to Pernambuco after graduating from the Federal University of Rio de Janeiro Faculty of Law.

Imprisonment and exile

In the military takeover of the government of Brazil in 1964 Arraes was jailed and exiled. He initially refused to resign as governor of Pernambuco and was jailed by the military government in a political prison on the island of Fernando de Noronha. Arraes remained in prison for 11 months before being granted asylum in Algeria. He remained there for 14 years and returned to Brazil in 1979.

See also
 List of mayors of Recife

References

|-

|-

|-

|-

|-

|-

1916 births
2005 deaths
Brazilian Socialist Party politicians
Governors of Pernambuco
20th-century Brazilian lawyers
Federal University of Rio de Janeiro alumni
Brazilian Democratic Movement politicians
Brazilian exiles
Brazilian expatriates in Algeria
Members of the Legislative Assembly of Pernambuco
Mayors of Recife
Arraes family